Yenişarbademli is a town and district of Isparta Province in the Mediterranean region of Turkey. The population is 2,136 as of 2010.

Location
The district center lies at a distance of five kilometers to the west from Lake Beyşehir. The remains of the thirteenth century Anatolian Seljuk palace of Kubadabad on the lake shore are located very near the town, although their locality administratively depends the neighboring Beyşehir district.

Unique characteristics
Yenişarbademli is also notable in having Pınargözü Cave, the longest cave as it stands in Turkey, which is situated at a distance of 8 kilometers to the south of the center town, in the dense woodlands of the Taurus Mountains. The cave's length is at least 12 kilometers, as reached by a joint Turkish-British-French team in 1991, while its exact extension is estimated to reach .

See also
 Lake Beyşehir
 Kubadabad Palace

References

External links
 District governor's official website 

Populated places in Isparta Province
 
Towns in Turkey